The Sespe Wilderness is a  wilderness area in the eastern Topatopa Mountains and southern Sierra Pelona Mountains, within the Los Padres National Forest (LPNF), in Ventura County, Southern California. The wilderness area is primarily located within the Ojai and Mt. Pinos ranger districts of the LPNF.

The wilderness was created by the U.S. Congress as part of the Los Padres Condor Range and River Protection Act of 1992 (Public Law 102-301). The same legislation also established the Chumash, Garcia, Machesna Mountain, Matilija, and Silver Peak Wilderness areas. The Sespe Condor Sanctuary is within the Sespe Wilderness. It was established to promote the propagation and growth of the California condor, and is closed to the public.

Features
The Sespe Wilderness is primarily chaparral-covered terrain, with areas of California oak woodland and riparian habitats. A section of Sespe Creek flows through it.

There are hiking trails, perennial and seasonal creeks, waterfalls, hot springs, rock formations, and designated campsites in the wilderness area.

Nearby wilderness areas of the southern Los Padres National Forest include the Matilija Wilderness (west) and Chumash Wilderness (northwest). The Dick Smith Wilderness is further to the northwest.

See also

References

Wilderness areas of California
Los Padres National Forest
San Emigdio Mountains
Topatopa Mountains
Protected areas of Ventura County, California
Protected areas established in 1992
1992 establishments in California